The Sumathi Best Television Current Reporting Award is presented annually in Sri Lanka by the Sumathi Group of Campany associated with many commercial brands for the best Sri Lankan current news reporting of the year in television screen.

The award was first given in 2011. The award is given to the best two current news reporting television channel. Following is a list of the winners of this prestigious title since then.

References

Awards established in 2011
2011 establishments in Sri Lanka